= Paranoid Girls =

- Directed by: Pedro del Santo
- Written by: Helena Montesinos
- Produced by: Pedro del Santo
- Starring: Mairen Muñoz; Marta Mir; Patricia Valley; Antonio Ibáñez; Ángel de Miguel; Bárbara de Lema
- Edited by: Jorge Garcia Soto
- Music by: Javier del Santo
- Release date: 13 November 2015 (Spain)
- Running time: 89 minutes
- Country: Spain
- Language: Spanish

Paranoid Girls (Spanish: Chicas Paranoicas) is a 2015 Spanish comedy film, directed by Pedro del Santo in his directorial debut.

== Plot ==
Three Spanish girls get involved in the fashion business and experience the glam and the glitter and also may some money. They find out that business has a dark side and there are people who try to exploit the rookies.

== Cast ==
- Patricia Valley ... Veronica
- Antonio Ibáñez ... Miguel
- Ángel de Miguel ... Andrés
- ... Diana
- Rafa Ramos ... Jorge
